Quispel is a Dutch surname. Notable people with the surname include:

 Freddy Quispel (born 2000), Dutch footballer
 Gilles Quispel (1916–2006), Dutch theologian and religious historian
 Huibert Victor Quispel (1906–1995), Dutch naval officer

Dutch-language surnames